Duets with the Spanish Guitar, Vol. 2 is an album by the Brazilian guitarist Laurindo Almeida, with violist Virginia Majewski and French Horn player Vincent DeRosa. It was originally released by Capitol Records in 1962 with the title The Intimate Bach.

The album received a Grammy Nomination for Best Classical Performance - Chamber Music (1962).  

In his review of the record, music critic Alfred Frankenstein specifically praises the horn playing of Vincent DeRosa, writing, "This is the most astonishing example of virtuosity on the horn I have ever heard on records...To play as lightly and speedily as a harpsichord, right out in the open with a minimum of support, is to give an incredible performance."

Track listing

Personnel
Laurindo Almeida - guitar
Virginia Majewski - viola
Vincent DeRosa - French horn

Notes 

1960s classical albums
Laurindo Almeida albums
Capitol Records albums